St. Thomas More Academy (STMA) is a private, co-educational, college preparatory school operated by Catholic laity.   It is operated independently of the Roman Catholic Diocese of Raleigh.  It serves students and their families in the Raleigh, North Carolina area.  Formerly a 9–12 school, starting in the 2020–2021 school year, they are adding a middle school program to serve grade 6–8.

History 
The school was founded in 2002 to meet the growing needs of Raleigh Catholics. Some of these families approached Bishop Francis Joseph Gossman about starting and gaining approval for this independent school to operate. The first classes were held at St. Luke the Evangelist Catholic Church in Raleigh. The school relocated to a larger facility at Paragon Park Road in Raleigh in 2004. In 2006, the school relocated to a larger space on Spring Forest Road. Since that time the school has grown and opened a new three-acre campus in August 2007. In 2012, the campus was further expanded to include a second building. The campus houses classrooms, faculty offices, laboratories, two theaters, a library, and a chapel.

Student life 
Service and outreach work is a requirement for all students at St. Thomas More Academy. Freshmen serve the young at St. Joseph Preschool, Sophomores feed the hungry at the Raleigh Rescue Mission and at Catholic Parish Outreach, Juniors care for the elderly at Raleigh Heritage Senior Living Center, and Seniors work at Habitat for Humanity construction sites to build shelters for the homeless. 
Every year, a group of students from St. Thomas More Academy joins the Bishop of Raleigh and other members of the Diocese in Washington, D.C. at the March for Life.

St. Thomas More Academy offers a variety of clubs, special events, and sports. More than seventy-five percent of the student body is engaged in extracurricular activities, with most programs being started through the initiative of students.

Athletics 
St. Thomas More is a member of the Carolina Independent Conference. Sports offered at STMA include soccer, basketball, cross country, volleyball, Ultimate Frisbee, track & field, and baseball.

See also

Cardinal Gibbons High School
National Catholic Educational Association

References

External links 
 St.Thomas More Academy STMA homepage
 Diocese of Raleigh
 National Association of Private Catholic Schools(NAPCIS)
 Roman Catholic Diocese of Raleigh, North Carolina

Private schools in Raleigh, North Carolina
Roman Catholic Diocese of Raleigh
Catholic secondary schools in North Carolina